Saatchi Art is an online art gallery and artist network. Saatchi Art is based in Los Angeles, California.

History
The company was originally known as Saatchi Online. The Saatchi Art marketplace contains original paintings, photography, drawings and sculpture by artists from over 100 countries worldwide.

In August 2014, Saatchi Art was acquired by Demand Media, Inc. (now Leaf Group).

Controversies

Charles Saatchi lawsuit
In November 2014 Charles Saatchi, the owner of Saatchi Gallery, initiated legal action in the United Kingdom's Chancery Division  of High Court of Justice against the current owners of Saatchi Art. He demands to stop using the name Saatchi Art due to a breach of an Intellectual Property agreement of February 18, 2010. He also asks to be paid out the share of the profit made by using the name Saatchi Art from the moment of alleged breach.

References

External links 
 

Contemporary art galleries in the United States
Art galleries established in 2006
2006 establishments in California